Events in the year 2005 in the Palestinian territories.

Incumbents
Palestinian National Authority (non-state administrative authority)
 President – Rawhi Fattouh (Interim-President of the PA) until January 15, Mahmoud Abbas (Fatah)
 Prime Minister – Ahmed Qurei (Fatah) until December 18, Nabil Shaath (Interim-PM of the PA) until December 24, Ahmed Qurei (Fatah)

Events

 January 10 – Mahmoud Abbas is officially declared winner of the Palestinian presidential election, with 62.3% of the votes cast.
 January 12 – Morag attack: One Israeli civilian is killed and three IDF soldiers are wounded when a bomb is detonated against a military vehicle patrolling the route near Morag. Two terrorists are killed by IDF forces. The area was booby-trapped with explosive devices, in addition to the bomb that exploded. Palestinian Islamic Jihad claims responsibility.
 January 13 – Karni border crossing attack: Palestinian Arab militants explode a truck laden with explosives in the Karni crossing in the eastern Gaza Strip. At least six Israelis are killed, as well as three of the attackers, and about 10–20 are wounded in the attack. The al-Aqsa Martyrs' Brigades, the Popular Resistance Committees and Hamas claim joint responsibility.
 January 18 – Gush Katif checkpoint attack
 February 16 – The Knesset finalizes and approves Israel's unilateral disengagement plan with 59 in favor, 40 opposed, 5 abstaining.
 February 21 – Israel releases 500 Palestinian Arab prisoners, as a gesture of goodwill to the Palestinian Authority and to its chairman, Mahmoud Abbas. Israel plans to release another 400 Palestinian prisoners within the subsequent three months.
 February 25 – Stage Club bombing: A Palestinian Arab teenage suicide bomber blows himself up at the entrance to the "Stage" Club in Tel Aviv. Five Israelis are killed, and about 50 wounded. Islamic Jihad claims responsibility.
 February 28 – Israeli security forces intercept a car bomb in the Arrabah village near Jenin. The 200 kg explosive device, believed to have been the work of Palestinian Islamic Jihad, is later defused by IDF sappers.
 March 16 – Israel formally hands over Jericho to Palestinian Authority control, which is likely to strengthen Mahmoud Abbas.
 March 22 – Israel hands over control of Tulkarm to the Palestinian Authority.
 June 2 – Israel released 398 Palestinian Arab prisoners, the final phase of an Israeli pledge to release 900 prisoners as a goodwill gesture towards Palestinian Arab leader Mahmoud Abbas.
 June 20 – A Palestinian Arab female suicide bomber is caught at the Erez Crossing, carrying explosives and a detonator in her underwear. She planned to carry out a suicide bombing attack in the Soroka hospital where she received medical treatment and was scheduled for a doctors appointment. The woman was identified as Wafa Samir Ibrahim Bass and said she was sent by the Al-Aqsa Martyrs' Brigades.
 July 12 – Kenyon HaSharon bombing: Islamic Jihad takes responsibility for a suicide bombing in Netanya, which kills five Israelis at a shopping mall.
 August 15 – The beginning of the implementation of the disengagement plan from Gush Katif in the Gaza Strip.
 August 17 – Israel's unilateral disengagement: The first forced evacuation of Jewish settlers, as part of the disengagement, commenced under Maj. Gen. Dan Harel of the Southern Command's orders. About 14,000 Israeli soldiers and police prepared to forcibly evict settlers and "mistanenim" (infiltrators). There are scenes of troops dragging screaming settlers from houses and synagogues, but with less violence than expected.
 August 17 – An Israeli settler kills three Palestinian Arab civilians in the West Bank. The attack is condemned by Ariel Sharon as a "Jewish Terror act" and "twisted thinking" while Hamas claimed the right to avenge the deaths.
 August 23 – Israel's unilateral disengagement: The evacuation of 25 Jewish settlements in the Gaza Strip and West Bank is accomplished.
 August 28 – Central Bus Station Beer Sheva bombing: A Palestinian Islamic Jihad suicide bomber kills himself and wounds nearly 50 people in the southern Israeli city of Beersheba near the main bus terminal. According to sources, the bomber was trying to make his way to Beersheba's Soroka Hospital.
 September 12 – Israel withdraws the last of its troops from the Gaza Strip, effectively completing its unilateral disengagement plan.
 October 26 – Hadera Market bombing: A Palestinian Arab suicide bomber carries out an attack in Hadera, which kills six Israelis and injures twenty-six. Islamic Jihad claims responsibility for the attack.
 December 5 – Netanya bombing: A Palestinian Arab suicide bomber carries out an attack in Netanya, which kills five Israelis.
 December 29 – Tulkarem roadblock bombing: A suicide bomber attacks a checkpoint near the West Bank city of Tulkarm, killing one Israeli soldier, two Palestinian Arab civilians and himself. Islamic Jihad claims responsibility for the attack.

References

See also
 2005 in Israel

 
Palestinian territories
Years of the 21st century in the Palestinian territories
2000s in the Palestinian territories
Palestinian territories